Sunlight House is a Grade II listed building in the art deco style on Quay Street in Manchester, England. Completed in 1932 for Joseph Sunlight, at 14 storeys it was the tallest building in Manchester, and the top floors of turrets and multiple dormer windows and mansard roofs create a distinctive skyline.

Description
Sunlight House is a 14 storey steel and concrete structure, clad in Portland stone. The building is almost square in plan, with three street frontages, and a large central light-well. There is a basement swimming pool below a leadlight domed skylight at first floor in the centre of the lightwell. Each of the three street facades are seven bays, with the two street corners expressed as three sided towers, which each rise to a four level octagonal turret, topped by a domed lantern and finial.  Behind and between the turrets, the top four floors are expressed as a mansard roof with multiple setback square dormer windows, which together with the turrets create a distinctive skyline and a major feature in the city.

History
Sunlight House was completed in 1932, at the height of the Great Depression, and was built by architect and developer Joseph Sunlight as the headquarters of his property business, with offices and shops to let. It was originally intended to be 40 storeys high, but this plan was scaled down due to opposition by the city council. A 40 storey extension proposed in 1948 was never built.

The building was renovated in 1997 when it was found that bolts holding the cladding had rusted through. It now houses offices, shops and a health club. The health club uses the original basement swimming pool.

In the early 21st century, the building has changed hands many times. CIS bought Sunlight House from Gadaricus in 2002 for £27.5million and sold it in 2005 to Warner Estate Holdings for £40m.  In 2014, it was bought by Scottish Widows Investment Partners’ Property Trust for £34.5 million. In 2018, Aberdeen Standard Investments commissioned a £4 million refurbishment of Sunlight House.

See also

Listed buildings in Manchester-M3

References

Office buildings in Manchester
Towers in Greater Manchester
Grade II listed buildings in Manchester
Grade II listed office buildings
Art Deco architecture in England
Buildings with mansard roofs